Mary J. Mascher (born September 22, 1952) is an American politician who has served in the Iowa House of Representatives since 1995. She received her BA and MA from the University of Iowa.

Mascher currently serves on several committees in the Iowa House: the State Government committee; the Labor committee; and the Education committee. She is also an assistant minority leader. Her prior political experience includes serving as the chair of the Johnson County Democratic Party from 1986 to 1988, serving as a member of the Parks and Recreation Commission from 1974 to 1977, and serving as a member of the Iowa City River Front commission from 1974 to 1977.

Mascher was re-elected in 1996, 1998, 2000, 2002, 2004, 2006, 2008, 2010, and in 2012. In 2006 she won with 6,236 votes, running unopposed.

References

External links
 Representative Mary Mascher official Iowa General Assembly site
Mary Mascher State Representative official constituency site
 

1952 births
Living people
Politicians from Iowa City, Iowa
University of Iowa alumni
Democratic Party members of the Iowa House of Representatives
Women state legislators in Iowa
21st-century American politicians
21st-century American women politicians